Eli Johana Moreno Valencia (born 15 April 1985 in Carepa, Antioquia) is a Colombian track and field athlete who specialises in the hammer throw. She represented her country at the 2008 Summer Olympics and 2012 Summer Olympics, and the 2009 World Championships in Athletics.  She is the Colombian record holder in the hammer with a best throw of 69.80, making her the second best South American thrower after Jennifer Dahlgren.

She is a two-time South American Champion and was runner-up in 2005 and 2006. She has also won two bronze medals at the Central American and Caribbean Championships, as well as a bronze at the 2006 Central American and Caribbean Games.

Career
She won her first continental medal at the 2005 South American Championships in Athletics, where she was runner-up to Jennifer Dahlgren but managed to improve the Colombian national record to 61.65 m. The following year she won a bronze medal at the 2006 Central American and Caribbean Games, setting a new record of 65.51 m. At the 2006 South American Championships in Athletics she was again behind Dahlgren at continental level and took the silver medal with a throw of 64.94 m. She ended the year with another silver behind Dahlgren at the 2006 South American Games which doubled as the Under-23 continental championships.

She achieved a season's best of 64.40 m to win the hammer at the Grand Prix Colombiano, where she also took the silver in the shot put with a throw of 14.05 m. Moreno obtained her first South American title at the 2007 South American Championships in Athletics, winning the hammer in São Paulo. She also took part in the 2007 Pan American Games that year and was eighth in hammer.

She made a strong start to the outdoor season in 2008, setting a new national record of 67.09 m to take the bronze at the 2008 Central American and Caribbean Championships. She improved this further at the Colombian Grand Prix in Bogotá, recording a mark of 68.00 m. She was selected to represent her country at the Olympics for the first time at the 2008 Beijing Games. She threw 64.66 m in the qualifiers and did not progress to the final.

Moreno began 2009 with an improvement to 69.80 m in March at the Grand Prix Sudamericano in Santa Fe, Argentina, making her the second best South American hammer thrower after Dahlgren. She won her second continental title at the 2009 South American Championships in Athletics with a throw of 65.79 m, and then took the bronze at the 2009 CAC Championships behind Cuban Arasay Thondike and improving Venezuelan Rosa Rodríguez. She attended her second global event – the 2009 World Championships in Athletics – but her throw of 65.05 m was again not enough to make the final.

In 2010, Moreno's best throw (in hammer throw) was 66.98 metres of which she achieved at the Central American and Caribbean Games. She received 1st place in the games after throwing further than the Venezuelan record holder, Rosa Rodriguez. Moreno competed in no other major competitions in 2010.

2011 was a more successful year for Moreno than the previous year, placing 1st at the Central American and Caribbean Champiopnships for the first time (bronze in 2008 and 2009) and achieving second at the South American Championships behind accomplished athlete, Jennifer Dahlgren. Moreno also competed at the Pan American Games coming 12th place with a throw of 59.23 metres. Her best throw was 68.53 metres which she did at the Central American and Caribbean Champiopnships. It was also her best throw since 2009.

Personal bests

All information taken from IAAF profile.

Major competition record

References

External links

1985 births
Living people
Colombian female hammer throwers
Athletes (track and field) at the 2008 Summer Olympics
Athletes (track and field) at the 2012 Summer Olympics
Athletes (track and field) at the 2007 Pan American Games
Athletes (track and field) at the 2011 Pan American Games
Olympic athletes of Colombia
Sportspeople from Antioquia Department
Pan American Games competitors for Colombia
Central American and Caribbean Games gold medalists for Colombia
Central American and Caribbean Games bronze medalists for Colombia
South American Games silver medalists for Colombia
South American Games bronze medalists for Colombia
South American Games medalists in athletics
Competitors at the 2014 South American Games
Athletes (track and field) at the 2018 South American Games
Competitors at the 2006 Central American and Caribbean Games
Competitors at the 2010 Central American and Caribbean Games
Competitors at the 2014 Central American and Caribbean Games
Competitors at the 2018 Central American and Caribbean Games
Central American and Caribbean Games medalists in athletics
20th-century Colombian women
21st-century Colombian women